Mali has sent athletes to Summer Olympic Games held in 1964, 1968, 1972, and every other Olympics since 1980, although the country has never won an Olympic medal.  No athletes from Mali have competed in any Winter Olympic Games.

The National Olympic Committee for Mali was formed in 1962 and recognized by the International Olympic Committee in 1963.

Medal tables

Medals by Summer Games

See also
 List of flag bearers for Mali at the Olympics
 Mali at the Paralympics

External links